Rainbow Town is a 2010 Liberian documentary, directed by Lauren Selmon Roberts.

Summary
In a war torn country where people are being killed and their children are left as orphans, the orphans are often not able to bear the challenges that comes their way, so they start dying as time goes on. It took one woman who empowered the orphans to believe that there is light after the tunnel despite the challenges they face.

Cast
 Ellen Johnson Sirleaf
 Taylor Johnson
 Alice Joseph
 Faith Kolleh

References

English-language Liberian films
Liberian documentary films
2010s English-language films